Monika Karsch (born 22 December 1982) is a German shooter.  She represented her country at the 2016 Summer Olympics and won the silver medal in Women's 25 metre pistol.

References

External links

1982 births
Living people
German female sport shooters
Shooters at the 2016 Summer Olympics
Olympic shooters of Germany
Olympic medalists in shooting
Olympic silver medalists for Germany
Medalists at the 2016 Summer Olympics
Sportspeople from Regensburg
ISSF pistol shooters
Shooters at the 2019 European Games
European Games medalists in shooting
European Games silver medalists for Germany
Shooters at the 2020 Summer Olympics
21st-century German women